Liauda, also known as Kaunas Region, is a historical region centred around Liaudė river on the north from city of Kaunas, and located between Nemunas, Neris and Dubysa rivers. The region is located within modern borders of Lithuania. It borders historical regions of Samogitia, Suvalkija and Vilnius. Its area is approximately 6500 km2 (2509.7 square miles).

The Lithuanian signatory of Act of the Re-Establishment of the State of Lithuania, Algirdas Vaclovas Patackas states that three important persons of Lithuanian history originated from Liauda: Mikalojus Daukša, Czesław Miłosz, and Józef Piłsudski.

See also 
 Vilnius Region
 Suwałki Region

Notes

References

Bibliography 
 
 

Historical regions in Lithuania
Lithuania–Poland relations